Mark Benton (born 16 November 1965) is an English actor and television presenter known for his roles as Eddie in Early Doors, Howard in Northern Lights and Martin Pond in Barbara. Benton has also starred in the BBC One school-based drama series Waterloo Road as mathematics teacher Daniel "Chalky" Chalk from 2011 to 2014. In 2013, Benton took part in Strictly Come Dancing, and in 2015 he hosted the daytime game show The Edge.

Since 2018, Benton has played the leading role of Frank Hathaway in Shakespeare & Hathaway: Private Investigators on BBC1.

Early life
Benton was born in Guisborough, North Riding of Yorkshire, England, and attended Sarah Metcalfe Comprehensive School and, later, Stockton Billingham Technical College. Some of Benton's early acting experience came at Middlesbrough Youth Theatre with performances in plays such as Atmos Fear and Twist.

Career
Benton has a recurring role as Father McBride in the James Nesbitt series Murphy's Law and has starred with Vic and Bob in the series Randall and Hopkirk (Deceased) (remake), Catterick, and Monkey Trousers. In 1999, he played Mickey-O in "The Wedding", the last episode of series 5 of Ballykissangel. He also appeared as an earthly representative of the devil in the 2003 ITV drama The Second Coming and the 2005 ITV drama Planespotting. From 1999 to 2003 Benton played Martin Pond in sitcom Barbara. He has also starred in the BBC Three comedy I'm with Stupid and in the Doctor Who episode "Rose" as conspiracy theorist Clive. In late 2008, Benton starred in the ITV drama Britannia High and from 2009 to 2011 co-starred as Max de Lacey in Scoop. Benton also co-starred in the Roman Mysteries episode "The Slave Girl from Jerusalem".

Film roles include Ricky in Mike Leigh's Career Girls (1997), Phil in the 2001 cult British independent film Mr In-Between, and Vic in the British comedy Three and Out (2008). Benton featured in all three of The Booze Cruise episodes, with Martin Clunes and Brian Murphy, among others. In 1996 he appeared in Catherine's Cookson The Girl.

Benton played the role of the bank manager in a string of eight television commercials for the Nationwide Building Society, directed by Armando Iannucci, shown from 2004 to 2010.

In April 2008, Benton appeared as Jess Yates in the BBC Four drama Hughie Green, Most Sincerely.

Benton did the voiceover for the programme Street Doctor on BBC One.

Other roles have included Connor in Afterlife (2005), Dad in The Imaginarium of Doctor Parnassus (2009), Hustle (2010), and Farmer Finch in the BBC's Land Girls.

Benton joined the cast of BBC drama Waterloo Road in its seventh series as Daniel 'Chalky' Chalk, a maths teacher, until 6 March 2013. He returned for an episode in series 9.

In 2011, Benton appeared in The Railway Children at Waterloo Station in London as Mr Perks.

On BBC Radio 4, Benton starred as the optimistic title character Harvey Easter in Mr Blue Sky, written by Andrew Collins and broadcast in May and June 2011. A second series was due for May 2012. Benton has also played Fred the butcher in the televised series of episodes by Catherine Cookson.

In 2012, Benton appeared in the one-off special Panto! as Francis, the Director of the play. In July 2012, it was announced that Benton would star as Edna Turnblad in the 2013 UK tour of Hairspray the Musical, starting in February 2013 and finishing in September 2013.

In 2015, Benton appeared as Police Constable Walt Everett in the BBC daytime series Father Brown, episode 3.12 "The Standing Stones". He also appeared as Les in the "La Couchette", the first episode of the second series of anthology series Inside No. 9. In 2015, Benton presented the BBC One daytime game show The Edge for its first series, being replaced by Gabby Logan.

In 2016, UK progressive rock band Gandalf's Fist announced that Benton will voice several characters on their album "The Clockwork Fable"

On 21 August 2016, Benton played Bottom in A Midsummer Night's Dream (Mendelssohn) in the BBC prom 48. Benton appeared as a bartender in the December 2016 Christmas Special of British Sitcom Outnumbered.

In 2017, he played Dennis Feldman in the ITV drama, The Halcyon.

As of February 2018, Benton is currently starring as Frank Hathaway, alongside actress Jo Joyner in the new BBC daytime comedy drama Shakespeare & Hathaway: Private Investigators.
Benton played the role of Eddie Rowbotham in episode 2 of the 20th season of Midsomer Murders ("Death of the Small Coppers").

Strictly Come Dancing
In September 2013, Benton became one of the contestants in the eleventh series of the BBC One show Strictly Come Dancing, where he was partnered with world dancing champion Iveta Lukosiute. The couple left the show on week 10 after losing the public vote. Mark Benton has been in the most consecutive dance-offs in Strictly history with the number of 4 weeks in a row. He got eliminated on the 4th dance-off.

Filmography

Film

Television

Personal life
Benton has been married to Sarah Gardner since 2002 and has three children. He is a supporter of Middlesbrough F.C. and has featured in the club's official website advertising campaign to encourage other fans to renew their season tickets.

References

External links
 

1965 births
Living people
English male film actors
English male television actors
People from Guisborough
Alumni of RADA
20th-century English male actors
21st-century English male actors